The fourth season of the American version of the television reality program Love Island premiered on July 19, 2022. The fourth season is the first to be released on Peacock, after the series previously aired on CBS. Sarah Hyland takes over hosting duties from Arielle Vandenberg, who hosted the series for its first three seasons.

Matthew Hoffman, who provided voice-over narration for the first three seasons, also does not return for this season. Instead, the narrator of the original British version, Iain Stirling, takes over as narrator.

Format 

Love Island is a reality television program in which a group of contestants, who are referred to as "Islanders", are living in a villa in California. The Islanders are cut off from the outside world and are under constant video surveillance. To survive in the villa, the Islanders must be in a relationship with another Islander. The Islanders couple up for the first time on first impressions but they are later forced to "re-couple" at special ceremonies in which they can choose to remain with their current partners or to switch partners. At the villa, the couples must share a bed for sleeping and are permitted to talk with other Islanders at any time, allowing them to get to know everyone. While in the villa, each Islander has their own telephone, with which they can contact other Islanders via text and can receive text messages informing them of the latest challenges, dumpings, and re-couplings. While the Islanders might appear to have unmediated access to the outside world, they are limited in both their alcohol consumption and communication with the outside world. 

The Islanders are presented with many games and challenges that are designed to test their physical and mental abilities, after which the winners are sometimes presented with special prizes, such as a night at the Hideaway or a special date.

Islanders can be eliminated, or "dumped", for several reasons; these include remaining single after a re-coupling and by public vote through the Love Island mobile app. During the show's final week, members of the public vote to decide which couple should win the series; the couple who receives the most votes win.

At the envelope ceremony on finale night, the couple who received the highest number of votes from the public receives two envelopes, one for each partner. One envelope contains  and the other contains nothing. The partner with the  envelope may choose whether to share the money with their partner as a test of trust and commitment.

Islanders
The initial Islanders were revealed on July 11, 2022.

Bria and Chazz Bryant are the first set of siblings to compete on the show in the USA franchise. For the first time in the show's history, the series featured a returning contestant, with Mackenzie Dipman having previously appeared in the second season.

Production

Development 
On February 23, 2022, it was announced that the series would no longer air on CBS, who aired the first three seasons. The series was picked up for two additional seasons, including the fourth season by Peacock. In addition, the series no longer aired on CTV in Canada, who simulcasted the first three seasons with CBS. Instead, the series streamed on the CTV website and app, and also aired on the Crave linear channels and streaming, with episodes being added in line with Peacock. Additionally, on June 30, 2022, it was revealed that host Arielle Vandenberg would not return for the fourth season. Instead, it was revealed that actress and Modern Family star Sarah Hyland would take over as host.

The season is filmed in Santa Barbara, California.

Coupling and elimination history

Notes 

 :  Mady and Val entered the villa after the initial coupling and were told that after twenty-four hours they'd be allowed to steal a guy from another girl.
 :   As siblings, Bria was told to pick a girl for Chazz, and Chazz was told to pick a boy for Bria. Afterwards, the islanders had to choose between Tyler or Zeta, who were now left single, to be saved. The islander with the least amount of votes to save would be dumped from the island.
:   America voted for their favorite couple, with the five couples with the most votes being safe. The five saved boys then had to decide which vulnerable man to save, choosing Timmy, and the 5 saved girls had to decide which vulnerable woman to save, choosing Mady.
:   America voted for their favorite islanders. The top three boys and the top three girls who received the most votes were granted safety. The three safe girls then had to decide which vulnerable man to dump, choosing Bryce, and the three safe boys had to decide which vulnerable woman to dump, however Mady volunteered to leave the Villa instead.
:  As the final part for the Casa Amor twist in week 3, Casa Amor and the villa held two separate re-coupling ceremonies for the original islanders to choose whether to return to their previous partner or pick any new partner. Any of the 12 new islanders that remained single by the end of either ceremony was dumped from the villa. However, if one of the 12 original islanders remained single at the end of both ceremonies, they would still remain in the villa, but as a single islander. Jordan, Sam, Tre, Avery, Gabby, and Tigerlily remained single at the end the night, and were all dumped from the villa.
: The two single boys, Jeff and Jesse, were allowed to couple up with any single girl. These girls included Nadja, Kat, Sydney and Deb. Jeff chose Nadja and Jesse chose Deb.
:    America voted for their favorite couples. Since Sydney, Kat, and Joel were single, they were granted immunity from the vote. The three couples who received the least votes were vulnerable. The two couples who received the least votes, Chazz and Bella, and Chanse and Jared were dumped from the Villa.
:   America voted for the most compatible couples. The top four couples who received the most votes were safe. The four safe girls then had to decide which vulnerable man to dump, choosing Joel, and the four safe boys had to decide which vulnerable woman to dump, however Mackenzie volunteered to leave the Villa instead.
: Nadjha and Jeff volunteered to leave to the Villa, leaving three couples in the finale. America then voted for which couple they think should win Love Island. The couple with the most votes were declared the winners of Love Island and received the grand prize money.

Episodes

Release 
The season premiered on July 19, 2022. One new episode of the season is released each day on Peacock until the season finale episode. Each new episode releases onto the platform at 9:00pm EST.

References 

2022 American television seasons
Television shows filmed in California